Neoplanorbis tantillus is a species of very small air-breathing freshwater snail, an aquatic gastropod mollusk in the family Planorbidae, the ram's horn snails. This species is endemic to the United States. In  2012, it has been declared extinct by the IUCN Red List of Threatened Species.

The shells of this species appear to be dextral in coiling, but as is the case in all planorbids, the shell is actually sinistral. The shell is carried upside down with the aperture on the right, and this makes it appear to be dextral.

Original description 
Species Neoplanorbis tantillus was originally described by Henry Augustus Pilsbry in 1906.

Type locality is Coosa River near or in Wetumpka, Alabama.

Pilsbry's original text (the type description) reads as follows:

Note: "preceding species" in the description means Amphigyra alabamensis, because these two species were newly described in the same work.

References 

Planorbidae
Molluscs of the United States
Gastropods described in 1906
Taxonomy articles created by Polbot